Ministry of Power, Works and Housing is an arm of the Federal government of Nigeria with a responsibilities of  providing social amenities such as Power over Ethernet across the country. The Ministry in discharging this mandate is guided by the provisions of the laws provided under National Electric Power Policy (NEPP) of 2001, the Electric Power Sector Reform (EPSR) Act of 2005, Rural Electrification Implementation Strategy Plan 2016 and the Roadmap for Power Sector Reform of August 2010.

Administration 

Muhammadu Buhari appoint Babatunde Fashola former governor of Lagos State as minister of Ministry of Power, Works and Housing, served from 2015 to 2019, in 2019 Saleh Mamman was appointed as a new minister. the Minister of Works And Housing. The President makes the announcement after an inauguration of his cabinet in capital territory Abuja. Later on The president decided to split the ministry into two He appointed Sale Mamman as minister of Power and Fashola to handle Works and Housing.

Agency 
The Ministry executes its mandatory work through the following Seven (7) Agencies:

 Nigerian Electricity Regulatory Commission (NERC)
 Transmission Company of Nigeria (TCN)
 Nigerian Electricity Management Services Agency (NEMSA)
 Rural Electrification Agency (REA)
 Nigerian Electricity Liability Management Company (NELMCO)
 National Power Training Institute (NAPTIN)
 Nigerian Bulk Electricity Trading PLC (NBET)  http://www.power.gov.ng|Official Website for Ministry of Power, Works and Housing

External links 

     Official Portal

References 

Federal Ministries of Nigeria